The Central Criminal Court Act 1856 (19 & 20 Vict., c.16), originally known as the Trial of Offences Act 1856 and popularly known as Palmer's Act, was an Act of the Parliament of the United Kingdom. The Act allowed a crime committed outside the City of London or the County of Middlesex to be tried at the Central Criminal Court, the Old Bailey, rather than locally.

The Act was passed in direct and urgent response to anxieties that doctor and accused murderer William Palmer would not be able to have a fair trial at the assize court in his native Staffordshire because of public revulsion at the allegations. By conducting Palmer's trial at a neutral venue, there could be no appeal for a retrial on the basis that the court and jury had been prejudiced against the defendant.

However, an alternative hypothesis is that Palmer was a popular figure in Rugeley and would not have been found guilty by a Staffordshire jury: the implication being that the trial location was moved for political reasons so as to secure a guilty verdict. Lord Chief Justice Campbellthe senior judge at Palmer’s trialsuggested in his autobiography that, had Palmer been tried at Stafford Assizes, he would have been found not guilty.

Notes

References

Bibliography
Davenport-Hines, R. (2004) "Palmer, William [the Rugeley Poisoner] (1824–1856)", Oxford Dictionary of National Biography, Oxford University Press, accessed 20 July 2007 (subscription required)

United Kingdom Acts of Parliament 1856
Acts of the Parliament of the United Kingdom concerning London
English criminal law
1856 in London
1856 in England
Old Bailey